Rugosocleptes rugicollis is a species of beetle in the family Cerambycidae, and the only species in the genus Rugosocleptes. It was described by Fauvel in 1906.

References

Parmenini
Beetles described in 1906